Mario Virginio Ortiz Velásquez (born 4 June 1983) is a Mexican former professional footballer who played as a forward most recently for Cafetaleros de Tapachula in the Ascenso MX.

Club career
Ortiz made his professional debut with Cruz Azul in 2000. He was loaned to Querétaro FC for one tournament-deal. After this tournament, he returned to Cruz Azul where he played until 2006 until he was transferred to Puebla F.C. He spent one year in the institution where he was again transferred to another club, Tecos. He had a good performance in this team which caused Mexican manager Enrique Meza to request Cruz Azul to sign him again. He finally returned to Cruz Azul for Apertura 2009. During his spell at Chiapas he only played with the reserve squad.

External links
 
 

1983 births
Living people
Mexican footballers
Mexico under-20 international footballers
People from Oaxaca
Association football forwards
Liga MX players
Cruz Azul footballers
Querétaro F.C. footballers
Tecos F.C. footballers
Club Puebla players
Atlante F.C. footballers